"Turn of the Century" is a song recorded by American country music group Nitty Gritty Dirt Band.  It was released in May 1989 as the first single from their Will the Circle Be Unbroken: Volume Two compilation album.  The song reached #27 on the Billboard Hot Country Singles & Tracks chart.  The song was written by J. Fred Knobloch and Dan Tyler.

Chart performance

References

1989 singles
1989 songs
Nitty Gritty Dirt Band songs
Songs written by J. Fred Knobloch
Songs written by Dan Tyler